Reese Dismukes (born October 20, 1992) is a former American football center.

Early years
Dismukes attended Spanish Fort High School in Spanish Fort, Alabama, where he played football and competed in track. He was a four-star recruit by Rivals.com and was ranked as the number one center in his class. He committed to Auburn University in April 2010 to play college football.

College career
Dismukes started all 13 games at center as a freshman in 2011. As a sophomore in 2012, he started all 10 games he played in, missing two due to injury. Dismukes started all 14 games as a junior in 2013 and was a first-team All-SEC selection. Dismukes entered his senior season in 2014 as a fourth-year starter. He again started all 13 games, winning the Rimington Trophy and being named a consensus All-American. He ended his career starting all 50 games he played in.

Professional career

Pittsburgh Steelers
On May 2, 2015, Dismukes was signed as an undrafted free agent. On September 5, 2015, he was waived. On September 6, 2015, Dismukes was signed to the Steelers' practice squad. On September 8, 2015, he was released from the practice squad.

Carolina Panthers
On October 27, 2015, Dismukes was signed to the Panthers' practice squad. On November 23, 2015, he was released from practice squad. On November 24, 2015, he was re-signed to the practice squad. On February 7, 2016, Dismukes's Panthers played in Super Bowl 50. In the game, the Panthers fell to the Denver Broncos by a score of 24–10. On August 28, 2016, Dismukes was waived by the Panthers.

Denver Broncos
On December 28, 2016, Dismukes was signed to the Broncos' practice squad.

References

External links
Auburn Tigers bio 

1992 births
Living people
People from Baldwin County, Alabama
Players of American football from Alabama
American football centers
Auburn Tigers football players
All-American college football players
Pittsburgh Steelers players
Carolina Panthers players
Denver Broncos players